Judge Bowen may refer to:

Dudley Hollingsworth Bowen Jr. (born 1941), judge of the United States District Court for the Southern District of Georgia
John Clyde Bowen (1888–1978), judge of the United States District Court for the Western District of Washington

See also
Justice Bowen (disambiguation)